Bremen Township is a township in Delaware County, Iowa, USA.  As of the 2000 census, its population was 849.

Geography
Bremen Township covers an area of 36.69 square miles (95.02 square kilometers); of this, 0.01 square miles (0.04 square kilometers) or 0.04 percent is water. Lakes in this township include Tegeler Pond.

Cities and towns
 Dyersville (west quarter)

Unincorporated towns
 Petersburg
(This list is based on USGS data and may include former settlements.)

Adjacent townships
 Colony Township (north)
 Liberty Township, Dubuque County (northeast)
 New Wine Township, Dubuque County (east)
 North Fork Township (south)
 Delhi Township (southwest)
 Oneida Township (west)
 Elk Township (northwest)

Cemeteries
The township contains two cemeteries: Saint Francis and Saint Peter and Paul.

Major highways
 U.S. Route 20

References
 U.S. Board on Geographic Names (GNIS)
 United States Census Bureau cartographic boundary files

External links
 US-Counties.com
 City-Data.com

Townships in Delaware County, Iowa
Townships in Iowa